Save the Children Jordan is located in the Jordanian capital of Amman and represents the Jordanian branch of the UK's Save the Children, which has been working in Jordan since 1985.

The branch is headed by its CEO, Manal Wazani, and Princess Basma bint Talal. Save the Children has operated in Jordan since 1985 and transitioned to Save the Children International in 2012.

References

External links
 Save the Children Jordan website

1985 establishments in Jordan
Organizations established in 1985
Organisations based in Amman
Charities based in Jordan
Jordan